The Ghost Inside may refer to:

 The Ghost Inside (film), a 2005 Chinese film
 The Ghost Inside (band), an American band formed in 2004
 The Ghost Inside (album), a 2020 album by the band
 "The Ghost Inside", a song on the 2010 Broken Bells album Broken Bells